Hermann Eduard Anton (17 December 1794, in Görlitz – 24 March 1872, in Halle) was a German malacologist.

Works 
 Anton H. E. (1839). Verzeichniss der Conchylien. Halle, xvi + 110 pp.

Some authors consider the work to be published in 1838 while others in 1839.

Taxa described 
Taxa described by Hermann Eduard Anton include (sorted chronologically):

1838
 Bonellia obtusa Anton, 1838
 Cardiocardita Anton, 1838
 Clanculus miniatus (Anton, 1838)
 Echinolittorina reticulata (Anton, 1838)
 Eulima dubia Anton, 1838
 Eulima incerta Anton, 1838
 Fasciolaria magna (Anton, 1838)
 Fasciolaria sulcata (Anton, 1838)
 Fusinus indicus (Anton, 1838)
 Isognomon radiatus (Anton, 1838)
 Latirus fenestratus (Anton, 1838)
 Latirus impressus (Anton, 1838)
 Latirus plicatulus (Anton, 1838)
 Monoplex wiegmanni (Anton, 1838)
 Nerita planospira Anton, 1838
 Ostrea imputata Anton, 1838
 Oxystele tigrina (Anton, 1838)
 Oxystele variegata (Anton, 1838)
 Pecten excavatus Anton, 1838
 family Siliquariidae Anton, 1838
 Tectonatica tecta (Anton, 1838)
 Turbinella laevigata Anton, 1838
 Turridrupa cerithina (Anton, 1838)
 Vasum tubiferum (Anton, 1838)
 Vexillum cancellarioides (Anton, 1838)
 Vexillum interruptum (Anton, 1838)
 Vexillum semicostatum (Anton, 1838)

1839
 Asolene pulchella (Anton, 1839)
 Cantharus wagneri (Anton, 1839)
 Pollia wagneri (Anton, 1839)

1848
 Euchelus pullatus Anton, 1848

References 

1794 births
1872 deaths
German malacologists